Ramewadi is a town in Daddi Belgaum district of Karnataka, India.
Ramewadi is the major part of Daddi town, generally it is known as DADDI-RAMEWADI or Daddi.

It has a famous domestic Animal market in Belgaum district and maharashtra as well goa, held weekly on Monday.

Daddi is well Connected to Belgaum city by roads. Other nearby cities are Kolhapur, Gadhinglaj, Ajara, Sankeshwar, Nipani, Gokak, Hukkeri etc.

References

Villages in Belagavi district